Senator Kidd may refer to:

Chris Kidd (born 1979), Oklahoma State Senate
Don Kidd (1937–2020), New Mexico State Senate
Edward I. Kidd (1845–1902), Wisconsin State Senate